Martina Franca-Colonne Grassi is a railway station in Martina Franca, Italy. The station is located on the Bari–Martina Franca–Taranto railway. The train services are operated by Ferrovie del Sud Est.

Train services
The station is served by the following service(s):

Local services (Treno regionale) Martina Franca - Taranto

References

This article is based upon a translation of the Italian language version as at June 2014.

External links

Railway stations in Apulia
Martina Colonne Grassi station
Buildings and structures in the Province of Taranto